The National Service Regiment was a former general service regiment of the Ceylon Army which was formed during the 1971 JVP Insurrection to meet the additional requirements. It was subsequently disbanded in 1977 with its officers and men transferred to other units in the Sri Lanka Army Volunteer Force.

References

Sri Lanka Army Volunteer Force
Disbanded regiments of the Sri Lankan Army
Military units and formations established in 1971
Military units and formations disestablished in 1977